Twal is a surname. Notable people with the surname include:

Alex Twal (born 1996), Lebanese rugby player
Alia Twal, Jordanian pilot
Fouad Twal (born 1940), Jordanian Archbishop

See also
Tal (name)

Arabic-language surnames